The Caripetuba River is a river of Pará state in north-central Brazil. It is an important river in its region to supply feeding the local population, beyond being a way of pluvial transport.

See also
List of rivers of Pará

References

Rivers of Pará